Shaler is a surname. Notable people with the surname include:

Alexander Shaler (1827–1911), Union Army general
Lynn Shaler (born 1955), American artist
Nathaniel Shaler (1841–1906), American paleontologist and geologist
William Shaler (1733–1833), American diplomat and writer